The RS-28 Sarmat (named after the Sarmatians; NATO reporting name: SS-X-29 or SS-X-30), often unofficially called Satan II by some media outlets, is a Russian liquid-fueled, MIRV-equipped super-heavy intercontinental ballistic missile (ICBM) produced by the Makeyev Rocket Design Bureau since 2009. It is intended to replace the R-36M ICBM (SS-18 'Satan') in Russia's arsenal.

The Sarmat is one of six new Russian strategic weapons unveiled by Russian president Vladimir Putin on 1 March 2018. The RS-28 Sarmat made its first test flight on 20 April 2022, and as of December 2021, the Russian government expected the missile to enter service in 2022. On 16 August 2022, a state contract was signed for the manufacture and supply of the Sarmat strategic missile system.

History
In February 2014, a Russian military official announced the Sarmat was expected to be ready for deployment around 2020. In May 2014 another official source suggested that the program was being accelerated, and that it would, in his opinion, constitute up to 100 percent of Russia's fixed land-based nuclear arsenal by 2021.

In late June 2015, it was reported that the production schedule for the first prototype of the Sarmat was slipping.
The RS-28 Sarmat was expected to become operational in 2016.

On 10 August 2016, Russia successfully tested the RS-28's first-stage engine named PDU-99.

In early 2017, prototype missiles had been reportedly built and delivered to Plesetsk Cosmodrome for trials, but the test program was delayed to re-check key hardware components before initial launch. According to the commander of the Russian Strategic Forces Col. Gen. Sergei Karakayev, the RS-28 Sarmat would be deployed with the 13th Red Banner Rocket Division of the 31st Missile Army at Dombarovsky Air Base, Orenburg Oblast, and with the 62nd Red Banner Rocket Division of the 33rd Guards Rocket Army at Uzhur, Krasnoyarsk Krai, replacing the previous R-36M ICBMs currently located there.

In late December 2017, the first successful launch test of the missile was carried out at the Plesetsk Cosmodrome in Arkhangelsk Oblast. According to the report, the missile flew several dozen kilometers and fell within the test range.

On 1 March 2018, Russian president Vladimir Putin, in his annual address to the Federal Assembly, said that "the active phase of tests" of the missile had begun. Shortly after, an anonymous military source was cited as saying that the 2007 information about the Sarmat missile had been leaked to the West deliberately. On 30 March 2018, the Russian Defence Ministry published a video showing the Sarmat performing its second successful test-launch at the Plesetsk Cosmodrome.

On 24 December 2019, during the exhibition of the modern weapon systems at the National Defense Management Center, it was reported that Sarmat is capable of a "35,000 km sub-orbital flight". The trials of the "missile complex" were expected to be completed in 2021, and, during the 2020–2027 period, "twenty missile regiments are planned to be rearmed with the RS-28".

On 20 April 2022, according to the Russian Defense Ministry:   After the test, on 22 May, Roscosmos head Dmitri Rogozin warned that 50 new Satan II/RS-28 Sarmat/SS-X-30 intercontinental nuclear missiles will soon be combat ready.

The first contract for the production of the missiles was signed in August 2022.

Design
The RS-28 Sarmat will be capable of carrying about 10 tonnes of payload, for either up to 10 heavy or 15 light MIRV warheads, and up to 24 Avangard hypersonic glide vehicles (HGVs) or a combination of warheads and several countermeasures against anti-ballistic missile systems. The Russian Ministry of Defense said that the missile is Russia's response to the U.S. Prompt Global Strike system.

Sarmat has a short boost phase, which shortens the interval when it can be tracked by satellites with infrared sensors, such as the U.S. Space-Based Infrared System, making it more difficult to intercept. The Sarmat is able to fly a trajectory over the South Pole, which would require Fractional Orbital Bombardment (FOBS) capability, and is claimed to be completely immune to any current or prospective missile defense systems. 

According to various sources, RS-28's launch sites are to be equipped with the "Mozyr" active protection system, designed to negate a potential adversary's first strike advantage by discharging a cloud of metal arrows or balls kinetically destroying incoming bombs, cruise missiles and ICBM warheads at altitudes of up to 6 km.

See also
 RS-24 Yars
 RS-26 Rubezh
 R-36 (missile)
 UR-100N
 RT-2PM Topol
 RT-2PM2 Topol-M
 LGM-30 Minuteman
 Agni-VI
 DF-5
 DF-41

References

External links 

 RS-28
 

Nuclear missiles of Russia
Intercontinental ballistic missiles of Russia
Makeyev Rocket Design Bureau
Post–Cold War weapons of Russia
MIRV capable missiles